The Australian Banking Association (ABA), formerly the Australian Bankers' Association, is the trade association for the Australian banking industry. The ABA was founded in 1985 and is based in Sydney, New South Wales. The ABA represents twenty-two banks  and associate members. It provides analysis, advice, and advocacy for the banking industry and contributes to the public policy development on banking and other financial services. 

The Australian Banking Association (ABA) is also the information source for the news media on the Australian banking industry by providing information, analysis, and context on industry issues.

The ABA's stated goal is to advocate and promote policies for improvements and development of the banking industry through advocacy, research, policy expertise, and thought leadership.

In 2020, under the CEO Anna Bligh, the ABA's public profile has risen due to the industry's response to Australia's "Black Summer" fires, and collective measures to help cushion the economic impact of the COVID-19 pandemic.

Characteristics 
The Australian Banking Association’s members are 22 banks from across Australia.  The ABA works with the government, regulators and other stakeholders to improve public awareness and understanding of the industry’s contribution to the economy.

Leadership

Chairmen
The following served as Chairman of the Association:

Chief Executive Officers
The following served as Chief Executive Officers of the Association:

See also
 Banking in Australia
 Bank nationalization in Australia
 Financial regulation in Australia
 Four pillars policy
 Royal Commission into Misconduct in the Banking, Superannuation and Financial Services Industry
 Too big to fail

References

Advocacy groups in Australia
Banking in Australia
Banking industry
Bankers associations
1985 establishments in Australia